Goveji Dol is a small settlement east of Krmelj in the Municipality of Sevnica in central Slovenia. The area is part of the historical region of Lower Carniola. The municipality is now included in the Lower Sava Statistical Region. In 2006, Brezje, until then a hamlet of Goveji Dol, became an autonomous settlement. In 2008, a part of Goveji Dol and a part of Gabrje merged into a new settlement named Križišče.

References

External links
Goveji Dol at Geopedia

Populated places in the Municipality of Sevnica